The Roman Catholic Diocese of Jérémie, erected 20 April 1972, is a suffragan of the Archdiocese of Port-au-Prince.

Bishops

Ordinaries
Charles-Edouard Peters, S.M.M. (1972 - 1975)
Willy Romélus (1977 - 2009)
Joseph Gontrand Decoste, SJ (2009–present)

Other priest of this diocese who became bishop
Joseph Serge Miot, appointed Coadjutor Archbishop of Port-au-Prince in 1997

External links and references

GCatholic.org page for the Diocese of Jeremie

Jeremie
Jérémie
Jérémie
Roman Catholic Ecclesiastical Province of Port-au-Prince